Cisseps is a genus of moths in the family Erebidae erected by John G. Franclemont in 1936.

Species
 Cisseps fulvicollis (Hübner, [1818]) – yellow-collared scape moth
 Cisseps packardii (Grote, 1865)
 Cisseps wrightii (Stretch, 1885)

References

External links

Ctenuchina
Moth genera